Robert J. Kleine was the 43rd State Treasurer of Michigan, serving from 2006 to 2010.  He was appointed to his position effective April 9, 2006, by Governor Jennifer M. Granholm.

Born in Washington, D.C., on November 8, 1941, Kleine earned an economics degree from Western Maryland College (now McDaniel College) and a master's degree from Michigan State University.  From 1975 to 1984, Kleine was director of the Office of Revenue and Tax Analysis, where he helped author Michigan's Single Business Tax.

Kleine is a resident of East Lansing.

External links
Michigan Department of Treasury official state site
Project Vote Smart - Robert 'Bob' Kleine (MI) profile
Biographical notes at the Michigan Department of Treasury

State treasurers of Michigan
1941 births
Living people
Michigan State University alumni